Willie Rogers (3 July 1919 – 8 February 1974) was an English professional footballer who played as a winger for Blackburn Rovers and Barrow.

References

1919 births
1974 deaths
English footballers
Association football wingers
English Football League players
Blackburn Rovers F.C. players
Barrow A.F.C. players
Huddersfield Town A.F.C. wartime guest players
Preston North End F.C. players